The Port Moody Panthers are a junior "B" ice hockey team based in Port Moody, British Columbia, Canada. They were members of the Harold Britain Conference of the Pacific Junior Hockey League (PJHL) before being relocated to the Tom Shaw Conference for the 2014-15 season. The Panthers play their home games at the Port Moody Recreation Complex arena.

History
The team was founded in Port Coquitlam, British Columbia, as the Port Coquitlam Buckeroos until its relocation to Port Moody in 2006.

Season-by-season record
Note: GP = Games played, W = Wins, L = Losses, T = Ties, OTL = Overtime Losses, Pts = Points, GF = Goals for, GA = Goals against

NHL alumni
Colin Fraser
Zach Hamill
Andrew Ladd
Jeff Tambellini
David Jones

Awards and trophies
Best Defenceman
Matt Creechan: 2001-02
Chris Stew: 2010-11

Team captains
Nick Farina: 2000-01
Matt Creechan: 2001-02
Justin Boyd: 2005-06
Chris Boechler: 2006-07
Sean Docherty: 2007-08
Carson Bradshaw: 2008-09
Chris Stew: 2009-11
Cameron Patterson: 2011-12
Martin Campbell: 2012-13
James Jerczynski: 2014-16
Alexander McGovern: 2017-18
Michael Milosavljevic: 2018-20
Jayson Beauregard: 2020-21
Daniel Dalla Pace: 2021-present

External links
Official website of the Port Moody Panthers

Pacific Junior Hockey League teams
Ice hockey teams in British Columbia
Port Moody
Ice hockey clubs established in 1999
1999 establishments in British Columbia